The Christian Reformed Church in the Philippines is a Calvinist denomination in the Philippines, founded by American missionaries in the mid-1900.

Origin 
The church was first organised by missionaries Vince and Lucy Apostol, congregants of the Christian Reformed Church in North America. The mission started in 1962 when Christian Reformed World Missions began planting churches in Negros Island. In 1976, the denomination was officially organized with three congregations. Churches were organised into five classes. A synod was formed in 1983. By 1990, it had grown to 25 organized churches and 20 church plants. Now the church has over 50 congregations and 5,000 members.

The Christian Reformed Church in the Philippines is a member of the World Communion of Reformed Churches.

Theology

Creeds 
Apostles Creed
Athanasian Creed
Nicene Creed

Confessions 
Canons of Dort
Heidelberg Catechism
Belgic Confession

Seminary 
The Reformed Institute of Theology was founded in 1969 to provide theological training in the Philippine Christian Reformed Church. On January 1970, the seminary’s opening ceremony was held with an initial batch of 50 men and women. On June 1975, it became the Genevan Reformed Seminary. Finally, it became the Christian Reformed Seminary and Bible Institute. It is a growing institution, located in Bacolod, Negros Occidental.
The bible school in Bacolod City is non-operational as of this time.

References

External links 
www.glimlpc.yolasite.com, Christian Reformed Church in Las Pinas City 

Reformed denominations in the Philippines
Members of the World Communion of Reformed Churches
Evangelical denominations in Asia
Churches in Negros Occidental